Spontaneous is a live album by bassist and composer William Parker's Little Huey Creative Music Orchestra, which was recorded at the Vision Festival in New York in 2002 and released on the Italian Splasc(H) label.

Reception

AllMusic awarded the album 4 stars stating "Those who enjoy big-band abstractions immersed in wild, loud, and abrasive surroundings1960s styleshould appreciate the freestyle energy emanating from the orchestra... the uninitiated will likely find this all overwhelmingly imposing, but the rewards are numerous for the disciplined listener who takes the time to listen closely". Jazz Review noted "Parker leads his band-mates through torrid swing vamps and variable pulses, yet the music is a study in perpetual motion guided by the soloists’ blaring lines. A high-octane effort for sure, although there’s a noticeable bonding process that occurs, which is a trait that has become a staple of this unit’s line of attack".

Track listing
All compositions by William Parker
 "Spontaneous Flowers" - 28:55  
 "Spontaneous Mingus" - 32:50

Personnel
William Parker - bass
Roy Campbell, Jr. - trumpet, flugelhorn
Lewis Barnes, Matt Lavelle - trumpet 
Dick Griffin, Masahiko Kono, Alex Lodico, Steve Swell - trombone 
Dave Hofstra - tuba
Sabir Mateen - tenor saxophone
Rob Brown - alto saxophone, flute
Charles Waters - alto saxophone, clarinet
Ori Kaplan - alto saxophone
Darryl Foster - tenor saxophone, soprano saxophone
Dave Sewelson - baritone saxophone
Andrew Barker, Guillermo E. Brown - drums

References

2003 live albums
William Parker (musician) live albums
Albums recorded at the Vision Festival